The Texas Pacific Land Corporation is a publicly traded real estate operating company with its administrative office in Dallas, Texas. It was previously organized as an unusual legal entity, a publicly traded trust taxed as a corporation, and operated under the name Texas Pacific Land Trust.

History
TPL was created in February 1888 in the wake of the Texas and Pacific Railway bankruptcy, as a means to dispose of the T&P's vast land holdings. The certificates were later divided into "sub-share" certificates (3,000 sub-share certificates is the equivalent of one trust certificate), and the sub-share certificates have been traded on the NYSE since January 1927.

On March 23, 2020 the trust announced plans to convert the land trust to a C Corporation under Delaware law.  This was completed January 11, 2021.

Current operations
Despite having sold 75 percent of its original landholdings since inception, TPL is still among the largest private landowners in the State of Texas.  As of December 31, 2021, TPL owned  of land in 20 West Texas counties, of which the largest amount is located in Culberson (288,912 acres), Reeves (188,681 acres), and Hudspeth (154,247 acres) counties. In addition, TPL owns a 1/128th nonparticipating perpetual royalty interest in 84,934 acres, and a 1/16th nonparticipating perpetual royalty interest in 370,737 acres.

Trust income is derived from land sales, oil and gas royalties, grazing and sundry leases, interest on notes receivable, and interest on investments. The trust does not actively seek to sell its landholdings, and on rare occasions actually purchases land. (It last did so in 2008, acquiring  from the State of Texas in a parcel adjacent to existing holdings.) In June 2017, TPL established the formation of Texas Pacific Water Resources, LLC, a wholly owned subsidiary of the Trust. TPWR is a full service water business that offers brackish water sourcing, water disposal, water recycling, and other hydrocarbon extraction related water services.

Sub-share Buy Back Policy
TPL has a long-standing policy to repurchase sub-shares with excess cash. As noted in the 2015 annual report, "As provided in Article Seventh of the Declaration of Trust, dated February 1, 1888, establishing the Trust, it will continue to be the practice of the Trustees to purchase and cancel outstanding certificates and sub-shares. These purchases are generally made in the open market and there is no arrangement, contractual or otherwise, with any person for any such purchase."

In 2015, the Trust purchased and retired 204,335 sub-shares at a cost of $28,771,073, representing an average cost of $140.80 per sub-share. The number of sub-shares purchased and retired in 2015 amounted to 2.5% of the total number of sub-shares outstanding as of December 31, 2014.

The policy of buy backs has reduced the sub-share count by 26% between 2004 and 2015 (from 10,971,375 at the end of 2004 to 8,118,064 at the end of 2015.)
According to the most recent 10-Q filed for 2020, as required by the Securities and Exchange Commission, the stock has since shot up to an average of $1,600-$1,800 a share.

References

External links

Companies listed on the New York Stock Exchange
Companies based in Dallas
Real estate investment trusts of the United States